Robert Campbell Aitken (born April 21, 1963) is a Canadian electrical engineer. He was named a Fellow of the Institute of Electrical and Electronics Engineers (IEEE) in 2013 "for contributions to testing and diagnosis of integrated circuits." He has applied for forty-eight patents since 2007, mostly in conjunction with other ARM inventors.

Education and career
Aitken holds Ph.D. from McGill University. He joined the technical staff at Agilent Technologies, Santa Clara, California, in 2004. He later moved to ARM, a British multinational semiconductor and software designer company. In 2018, Aitken was appointed as the 56th Design Automation Conference General Chair.

References

External links

1963 births
Living people
Canadian electrical engineers
McGill University alumni
Fellow Members of the IEEE
Place of birth missing (living people)